Ernest Staddon (2 December 1882 – 23 July 1965) was an English cricketer. He played for Gloucestershire in 1912.

References

1882 births
1965 deaths
English cricketers
Gloucestershire cricketers
Cricketers from Bristol